Smartass is a 2017 American crime drama film directed by Jena Serbu and starring Joey King. It was released on September 12, 2017.

Cast
 Joey King as Freddie
 Luke Pasqualino as Donny
 Ronen Rubinstein as Nick
 Marc Menchaca as Rod
 Jake Weary as Mickey
 Helena Mattsson as Henna
 Yvette Nicole Brown as Officer Neesy
 Trevante Rhodes as Mike C
 Nicole LaLiberte as Chuchu
 Noel Gugliemi as Jose
 Emilio Rivera as Poco Efe
 Cara Santana as Venice
 Jahking Guillory as Kid K
 David Selby as Herman
 Vanessa Evigan as Bird
 D. C. Douglas as Dad

References

External links
 
 
 

2017 films
American drama films
Films set in the 20th century
2017 drama films
2010s English-language films
2010s American films